Tennis events were contested at the 2005 Summer Universiade in Izmir, Turkey.

Medal summary

Medal table

See also
 Tennis at the Summer Universiade

External links
World University Games Tennis on HickokSports.com

2005
Universiade
2005 Summer Universiade